Wubetu Abate (Amharic: ውበቱ አባተ; born 20 August 1978) is an Ethiopian professional football manager and former footballer who is currently the manager of the Ethiopia national team.

Playing career
Before retiring due to injury, Abate played domestic football in Ethiopia for Pulp and Worket in the 1990s.

Managerial career
Following retirement, Abate moved into coaching. In 2007, following success with Adama City, Abate was hired as manager of Dedebit. In 2011, Abate guided Ethiopian Coffee to the 2010–11 Ethiopian Premier League title. Abate later had stints at Sudanese club Al-Ahly Shendi, before returning to Ethiopia, managing CBE, Hawassa City, Fasil Kenema and Sebeta City. On 25 September 2020, Abate was confirmed as Ethiopia's manager, signing a two-year contract.

Honors
Ethiopian Coffee

Ethiopian Premier League: 2010–11

References

Living people
1978 births
Ethiopian footballers
Ethiopian football managers
Ethiopia national football team managers
Al-Ahly Shendi managers
Ethiopian expatriate football managers
Ethiopian expatriate sportspeople in Sudan
Association footballers not categorized by position